Nappanee West Park and Pavilion, also known as the Community Park of Nappanee, Nappanee Westside Park and Pavilion, and Nappanee West Park Chautauqua Pavilion, is a historic public park located at Nappanee, Elkhart County, Indiana. The Bungalow style pavilion was built in 1923 to house a local Chautauqua.  It was used for that purpose until 1925.  It was renovated in 1946 to temporarily house a school and in 1958 became home to the Nappanee Civic Theater.  The pavilion was renovated in the 1990s.  Also on the property is a contributing fire bell (1898).

It was added to the National Register of Historic Places in 1994.

References

Park buildings and structures on the National Register of Historic Places in Indiana
Parks on the National Register of Historic Places in Indiana
Buildings and structures completed in 1923
Buildings and structures in Elkhart County, Indiana
National Register of Historic Places in Elkhart County, Indiana